The 2004 McDonald's All-American Boys Game was an all-star basketball game played on Wednesday, March 31, 2004 at the Ford Center in Oklahoma City, Oklahoma, the future home of the NBA's Oklahoma City Thunder (then the Seattle SuperSonics). The game's rosters featured the best and most highly recruited high school boys graduating in 2004.  The game was the 27th annual version of the McDonald's All-American Game first played in 1978.

The 48 players were selected from 2,500 nominees by a committee of basketball experts. They were chosen not only for their on-court skills, but for their performances off the court as well. Coach Morgan Wootten, who had more than 1,200 wins as head basketball coach at DeMatha High School, was chairman of the selection committee. Legendary UCLA coach John Wooden, who has been involved in the McDonald's All American Games since its inception, served as chairman of the Games and as an advisor to the selection committee.

Proceeds from the 2004 McDonald's All American High School Basketball Games went to Ronald McDonald House Charities (RMHC®) of Oklahoma and its Ronald McDonald House® program.

2004 game
The game was telecast live by ESPN.  In the game's first appearance in the state of Oklahoma, the 14,424 in attendance were treated to a high scoring affair which featured seven NBA first round draft picks.

The East broke out to an early lead with their impressive inside-outside game. Five East Team players scored in double figures, led by J.R. Smith’s (Denver Nuggets) game high 25 points. J.R. excited the crowd on numerous occasions with his high flying dunks and long distance jumpers. The East also saw a solid contribution from Dwight Howard (Orlando Magic), who amassed 19 points and eight rebounds.  J.R. and Dwight shared the John R. Wooden Most Valuable Player Award. The East controlled the second half of the game, en route to their 126-96 victory.

Other key contributors for the East included, power forward Al Jefferson (Boston Celtics), who recorded 16 points and 11
rebounds, and swingman Rudy Gay (Memphis Grizzlies), who put up 10 points and four assists.  Point guard Sebastian Telfair (Boston Celtics), dished out a game high 11 assists and Rajon Rondo (Boston Celtics), had 14 points and four assists.

The West Team had several outstanding players who shared the spotlight.  DeMarcus Nelson led the West with 22 points and five rebounds. High school teammates from Detroit, Joe Crawford (Kentucky) and Malik Hairston (Oregon) contributed 15 and 11 points
respectively, while 6’11 center and first round draft pick Robert Swift (Oklahoma City Thunder) added 10 points and five
rebounds.

East roster

West roster

Coaches
The East team was coached by:
 Head coach Bob Flynn of Cardinal Gibbons School (Baltimore, Maryland)
 Asst Coach Neil Jones of Cardinal Gibbons School (Baltimore, Maryland)
 Asst Coach Leroy Combs of Noble High School (Noble, Oklahoma)

The West team was coached by:
 Head coach A.D. Burtschi of Putnam City High School (Oklahoma City, Oklahoma)
 Asst Coach Gary Wright of Northwest Classen High School (Oklahoma City, Oklahoma)
 Asst Coach Don Tuley of Capitol Hill High School (Oklahoma City, Oklahoma)

Boxscore

Visitors: East

Home: West 

(* = Starting Line-up)

All-American Week

Schedule 
 Monday, March 29: Powerade JamFest
 Slam Dunk Contest
 Three-Point Shoot-out
 Wednesday, March 31: 27th Annual Boys All-American Game

The Powerade JamFest is a skills-competition evening featuring basketball players who demonstrate their skills in two crowd-entertaining ways.  The slam dunk contest was first held in 1987, and a 3-point shooting challenge was added in 1989.

Contest winners 
 The 2004 Powerade Slam Dunk contest was won by a member of the women's team, Candace Parker.  This was only the second time a woman has participated in the slam dunk competition, and the first time a woman won the contest.

References

External links
McDonald's All-American on the web

2003–04 in American basketball
2004
2004 in sports in Oklahoma
Basketball competitions in Oklahoma City